Lake Kegonsa State Park is a state park of Wisconsin, United States, on the northeast shore of Lake Kegonsa. It is located in Dane County southeast of Madison, Wisconsin. The park consists of forest, prairie, and wetlands.

It was created by a glacier during the last ice age approximately 12,000 years ago.

See also
Lake Mendota
Lake Monona
Lake Waubesa

References

External links
Lake Kegonsa State Park

Kegonsa
Protected areas established in 1962
Protected areas of Dane County, Wisconsin
State parks of Wisconsin
1962 establishments in Wisconsin